Cyprus-Spain relations are the bilateral relations between Cyprus and Spain. The relations are defined mainly by the membership of both countries to the European Union, Council of Europe and Organization for Security and Co-operation in Europe, and the Union for the Mediterranean. Cyprus has an embassy in Madrid and consulates in Barcelona, Bilbao, Sevilla and Granada. Spain has an embassy in Nicosia.

History 
Spain and Cyprus established diplomatic relations on 22 December 1967. However, for a long time, there was no embassy resident in Nicosia: relations with Cyprus were covered from Damascus or Beirut. The Council of Ministers of 18 January 2002 appointed Ignacio García-Valdecasas as Spain's first ambassador in Nicosia, covering, with the opening of the Spanish Embassy in that capital, an institutional vacuum that until then, he had been feeling the task of adequately promoting the important relations existing with the Republic of Cyprus.

On the other hand, Cyprus inaugurated its Embassy in Madrid in 1992, being previously its embassy in Paris the one in charge to develop the relations with Spain. The first official visit of a Cypriot president to Spain goes back to July 1987, when Spyros Kyprianou met with the president Felipe González and was guest of honor at a dinner hosted by the King of Spain. Since then there have been six other presidential visits (Giorgios Vassiliou, Glavkos Klerides twice, and Tassos Papadopoulos in three).

The first visit of a Spanish president to Cyprus was that of José María Aznar, in February 2002, when he reiterated, on behalf of the European Union (presided over then by Spain), the validity of the agreements adopted at the Helsinki summit in 1991 to negotiate the accession of Cyprus, even if the reunification of the two areas in which the country is divided has not taken place. The second took place in December 2009, this time by José Luis Rodríguez Zapatero, who presented in Nicosia the priorities of the Spanish Presidency of the Council of the European Union that began the following month.

Queen Sofía inaugurated 10 March 2010 in Nicosia the exhibition "Miró de Mallorca", an anthology of the last 20 years of the painter's work in the Spanish island of the Mediterranean. It was the first time that an exhibition of such magnitude was held in Cyprus, coinciding with the Spanish presidency of the Council of the EU and with the acts of the 50th anniversary of the Republic of Cyprus.

These elements are but examples of the harmony and excellent relations between Spain and Cyprus. Invited by his counterpart Yiannakis Omirou, president of the Congress of Deputies, Jesús Posada, made an official visit to Cyprus between 13 and 14 July 2015, during which he was interviewed, in addition to Omirou, with the Minister of Foreign Affairs, Ioannis Kasoulides, and with the mayor of Nicosia, Constantinos Yiorkadjis. Spain supports the search for a negotiated solution, which allows the establishment of a bizonal and bi-communal federation, in accordance with the relevant resolutions of the United Nations Security Council, and that also respects, according to the Joint Declaration of the leaders of 11 February 2014, the principles of sovereignty, legal personality and unique citizenship.

Due to their geographical situation, both countries share, in addition, a special interest for the Mediterranean basin and especially support the policy
of common neighborhood of the European Union in this region. At the end of 2013, Cyprus and Spain promoted the creation of a "Mediterranean Group"
of consultation and consultation within the European Union. The first ministerial meeting of this group, in which seven countries participate, took place in Brussels in December 2013, while the second was held in Alicante in April 2014.
existing between Spain and Cyprus.

See also 
 Foreign relations of Cyprus
 Foreign relations of Spain
 Cyprus in the Eurovision Song Contest 2018

References

 
Spain
Cyprus